The Fourth Air Force (4 AF) is a numbered air force of the Air Force Reserve Command (AFRC). It is headquartered at March Air Reserve Base, California.

4 AF directs the activities and supervises the training of more than 30,000 Air Force Reservists.  If called to active duty, 4 AF's ready reserve units would be assigned to Air Mobility Command, Air Education and Training Command, and Pacific Air Forces. Several airfields are associated with the Fourth Air Force.

One of the four original pre–World War II numbered air forces, 4 AF was activated on 18 December 1940, at March Field, California with a mission of air defense of the Southwestern United States and Lower Midwest regions. During the war, its primary mission became the organization and training of combat units prior to their deployment to the overseas combat air forces.

4 AF is commanded by Brigadier General Derin S. Durham.

Units
Fourth Air Force flying units include one unit-equipped air mobility and two unit-equipped airlift wings, five unit-equipped air refueling wings, three associate air mobility wings, two associate airlift wings and one associate air refueling wing.

 Headquarters, Fourth Air Force, March ARB, California

 315th Airlift Wing, Joint Base Charleston, South Carolina
 C-17 Globemaster III
 349th Air Mobility Wing, Travis AFB, California
 C-5 Galaxy, KC-10 Extender, C-17 Globemaster III
 433d Airlift Wing, Lackland AFB, Texas
 C-5 Galaxy
 434th Air Refueling Wing, Grissom ARB, Indiana
 KC-135R Stratotanker
 439th Airlift Wing, Westover ARB, Massachusetts
 C-5 Galaxy
 445th Airlift Wing, Wright-Patterson AFB, Ohio
 C-17 Globemaster III
 446th Airlift Wing, McChord AFB, Washington
 C-17 Globemaster III
 452d Air Mobility Wing, March ARB, California
 C-17 Globemaster III, KC-135R Stratotanker
 459th Air Refueling Wing, Andrews AFB, Maryland
 KC-135R Stratotanker

 507th Air Refueling Wing, Tinker AFB, Oklahoma
 KC-135R Stratotanker
 512th Airlift Wing, Dover AFB, Delaware
 C-5 Galaxy, C-17 Globemaster III
 514th Air Mobility Wing, McGuire AFB, New Jersey
 KC-10 Extender, C-17 Globemaster III
 624th Regional Support Group, Hickam AFB, Hawaii
 914th Air Refueling Wing, Niagara Falls Air Reserve Station, New York
 KC-135R Stratotanker
 916th Air Refueling Wing, Seymour Johnson AFB, North Carolina
 KC-135R Stratotanker
 927th Air Refueling Wing, MacDill AFB, Florida
 KC-135R Stratotanker
 931st Air Refueling Wing, McConnell AFB, Kansas
 KC-135R Stratotanker
 940th Air Refueling Wing, Beale AFB, California
 KC-135R Stratotanker
911th Airlift Wing, Pittsburgh IAP Air Reserve Station, Pennsylvania
C-17 Globemaster III

History
One of the four original numbered air forces, Fourth Air Force was activated as the Southwest Air District of the GHQ Air Force on 18 December 1940, at March Field, California. It was redesignated Fourth Air Force on 26 March 1941 with a mission for the defense of the Southwest and Lower Midwest regions of the United States.

World War II

During World War II Fourth Air Force was the primary air defense command for the West Coast. The command also flew antisubmarine patrols along coastal areas of the Gulf of Mexico from after Pearl Harbor until October 1942. One of its primary fighter units was the 10th Fighter Wing at Hamilton Field, California.

On 29 September 1942, Rice Municipal Airport located in the Desert Training Center was acquired by the IV Air Support Command, and was operational by 26 October 1942. Re-designated Rice AAF it was used to train pilots and crews of aircraft whose mission it was to support ground troops.

Beginning in May 1942, the mission of Fourth Air Force became operational training of units and crews, and the replacement training of individuals for bombardment, fighter, and reconnaissance operations. It received graduates of Army Air Forces Training Command flight schools; navigator training; flexible gunnery schools and various technical schools, organized them into newly activated combat groups and squadrons, and provided operational unit training (OTU) and replacement training (RTU) to prepare groups and replacements for deployment overseas to combat theaters. The Fourth Air Force became predominantly a fighter OTU and RTU organization. Most P-51 Mustang and P-38 Lightning groups were trained by Fourth Air Force primarily due to the proximity of their manufacturing plants in Southern California. By 1944, most of the Operational Training of groups ended, with the command concentrating on RTU training of individual replacements using Army Air Force Base Units (AAFBU) as training organizations at the airfields controlled by Fourth Air Force.

Air Defense Wings were also organized for the major metropolitan areas along the West Coast, using training units attached to the Wings. By 1944 the likelihood of a full-scale air attack along the West Coast since the bombing of Dutch Harbor two years earlier was remote, and these air defense wings were reduced to paper units.

On 13 December 1944, First, Second, Third and Fourth Air Force were all were placed under the unified command of the Continental Air Forces.

Air Defense Command
In March 1946, USAAF Chief General Carl Spaatz had undertaken a major re-organization of the postwar USAAF that had included the establishment of Major Commands (MAJCOM), who would report directly to HQ United States Army Air Forces.  Continental Air Forces was inactivated, and Fourth Air Force was assigned to the postwar Air Defense Command in March 1946 and subsequently to Continental Air Command (ConAC) in December 1948 being primarily concerned with air defense.

It was also responsible for training Air Force Reserve and Air National Guard personnel throughout the region.

By 1949 with the establishment of the Western Air Defense Force (WADF), the air defense mission of the command was transferred to WADF, leaving Fourth AF free to focus on its reserve training tasks, which it did for the next decade. On 1 September 1960, Air Defense Command inactivated Fourth Air Force, transferring its reserve training mission to the Sixth Air Force Reserve Region.

Fourth Air Force was re-activated on 20 January 1966 again at Hamilton AFB, as part of Air Defense Command with the inactivation of its organization of Air Defense Sectors.  Its area of responsibility was essentially unchanged from its 1948 region.  Subordinate organizations assigned by ADC were the 25th 26th and 27th Air Divisions.

On 16 January 1968 Air Defense Command was re-designated Aerospace Defense Command (ADCOM) as part of a restructuring of USAF air defense forces. Fourth Air Force's second period of service was short-lived, however, and the command was again inactivated as the result of a major ADCOM reorganization on 31 December 1969 of the First Fourth, Tenth Air Forces and several Air Divisions. This reorganization was the result of the need to eliminate intermediate levels of command in ADCOM driven by budget reductions and a perceived lessening of the need for continental air defense against attacking Soviet aircraft.

ADCOM reassigned the units under the inactivated Fourth Air Force were reassigned primarily to the 25th and 26th Air Divisions.

Air Force Reserve

The command remained inactive until 8 October 1976, when it was activated as Fourth Air Force (Reserve) at McClellan Air Force Base, CA, and assigned to the Air Force Reserve. Fourth Air Force has been a key component of the Air Force reserve ever since.

Fourth Air Force personnel supported operations in Grenada (Operation Urgent Fury) and Panama (Operation Just Cause). More than 8,000 Air Force Reservists assigned to Fourth Air Force units served in the United States, Europe, and the Persian Gulf during Operation Desert Shield and Desert Storm. This included more than 2,878 medical personnel assigned to Fourth Air Force units.

Since the end of the Cold War, Fourth Air Force has supported humanitarian missions such as Provide Promise in the Balkans and Provide Relief and Restore Hope in Somalia. Units rushed to provide aid and rescue service to the residents of Florida, the Gulf Coast, and the Caribbean in the aftermath of the traumatic and prolonged 1995 hurricane season. It supported immediate assistance to aid victims and disaster officials following the bombing of the Oklahoma City Federal Building. Fourth Air Force units provided assistance for several natural disasters, including the 1994 Northridge earthquake in the Los Angeles area, and the catastrophic midwest floods and the California wildfires in 1993.

Fourth Air Force units routinely support United Nations and Department of State missions. Fourth Air Force people were on the first teams into Haiti for Operation Uphold Democracy, and supported Vigilant Warrior and Desert Thunder deployments to Southwest Asia. The men and women of Fourth Air Force continue to perform international peacekeeping and humanitarian missions on an almost daily basis.  Headquarters Fourth Air Force officially returned to its original home, now March Air Reserve Base, in Riverside, CA, in April, 1998.

In 2003 Fourth Air Force became an intermediate echelon responsible primarily for all Air Mobility Command gained AFRC air refueling units in the United States and AMC gained AFRC strategic airlift units in the western United States. Today the sixty person staff consists of Traditional Reservists, Air Reserve Technicians and civilian employees. They direct the activities and supervise the equipping and training of more than 30,000 Air Force reservists in unit programs located across the continental United States, Alaska, Hawaii and Guam. Reservists from 4 AF units were routinely deployed with Air Expeditionary units to fight in the Afghanistan War (2001-2021); the Iraq War (2003-2011); and later anti-ISIS (Daesh) operations.

Lineage
 Established as Southwest Air District on 19 October 1940
 Activated on 18 December 1940
 Redesignated: 4 Air Force on 26 March 1941
 Redesignated; Fourth Air Force on 18 September 1942
 Discontinued, and inactivated on 1 September 1960
 Activated on 20 January 1966
 Organized on 1 April 1966
 Inactivated on 30 September 1969
 Redesignated Fourth Air Force (Reserve) on 24 September 1976
 Activated in the Reserve on 8 October 1976
 Redesignated Fourth Air Force on 1 December 1985.

Assignments
 General Headquarters Air Force (later, Air Force Combat Command), 18 December 1940
 Western Defense Command, 11 December 1941
 United States Army Air Forces, 10 September 1943
 Continental Air Forces, 13 December 1944
 Air Defense Command, 21 March 1946
 Continental Air Command, 1 December 1948 – 1 September 1960
 Air (later, Aerospace) Defense Command, 20 January 1966 – 30 September 1969
 Air Force Reserve (later, Air Force Reserve Command), 8 October 1976 – .

Stations
 March Field, California, 18 December 1940
 Riverside, California, 20 January 1941
 Hamilton Field, California, 7 December 1941
 San Francisco, California, 5 January 1942
 Hamilton Field (later, AFB), California, 19 June 1946 – 1 September 1960; 1 April 1966 – 30 September 1969
 McClellan Air Force Base, California, 8 October 1976
 March ARB, California, 1 April 1998 – present

Components

Commands
 I Staging: 19 November 1945 – 3 April 1946
 4th Air Force Service (later, 4th Air Force Base; IV Air Force Base): 1 October 1941 – 31 March 1942
 4th Air Support (later, IV Air Support; IV Ground Air Support): 3 September 1941 – 17 August 1942
 4th Antiaircraft: 1 May 1944 – 6 February 1946
 Bomber Command, 4th Air Force (later, 4th Bomber, IV Bomber): 11 April – 19 September 1941; 19 September 1941 – 31 March 1944
 Interceptor Command, 4th Air Force (later, 4th Interceptor, IV Interceptor; IV Fighter): 22 April – 8 July 1941; 8 July 1941 – 31 March 1944.
 IV Emergency Rescue (Provisional): 30 December 1943 – 22 January 1944.
 Antiaircraft Artillery (Provisional): 27 December 1943 – 30 April 1944.

Regions
 Los Angeles Air Defense Region: 1 Jul 1944 – 31 Aug 1945
 San Francisco Air Defense Region: 1 Jul 1944 – 31 Aug 1945
 Seattle Air Defense Region: 1 Jul 1944 – 31 Aug 1945
 Sixth Air Force Reserve Region: 1 Jul – 1 Sep 1960.

District
 4th Air Reserve District: 1 Dec 1951 – 1 Apr 1954.

Air Divisions
 25th Air Division (later, 25th Air): 25 October 1948 – 1 April 1949; 8 July 1949 – 1 August 1950 (detached 10 November 1949 – 1 August 1950); 1 April 1966 – 15 September 1969.
 26th Air Division: 1 April 1966 – 30 September 1969.
 27th Air Division: 1 April 1966 – 15 September 1969
 28th Air Division: 8 December 1949 – 1 August 1950 (detached 1 January – 1 August 1950).

Sectors
 Los Angeles Air Defense Sector: 1 Apr – 25 Jun 1966
 Reno Air Defense Sector: 1 Apr – 25 Jun 1966

Wing
 552d Airborne Early Warning and Control Wing, 1 April 1966 – 15 September 1969

Groups (incomplete)
 64th Transport Group, 4 December 1940 - 31 March 1942
 473d Fighter Group, 1 November 1943 – 31 March 1944

List of commanders 
 Jacob Earl Fickel, 1940
 Maj Gen James H. Wahleithner, 1 May 1985
 Maj Gen James E. Sherrard III, 4 February 1990
 Maj Gen Wallace W. Whaley, 1 July 1993
 Maj Gen James P. Czekanski, 7 August 2000
 Maj Gen Robert E. Duignan, 7 September 2003

References

 Maurer, Maurer (1983). Air Force Combat Units of World War II. Maxwell AFB, Alabama: Office of Air Force History. .
 Ravenstein, Charles A. (1984). Air Force Combat Wings Lineage and Honors Histories 1947–1977. Maxwell AFB, Alabama: Office of Air Force History. .
  A Handbook of Aerospace Defense Organization 1946–1980, by Lloyd H. Cornett and Mildred W. Johnson, Office of History, Aerospace Defense Center, Peterson Air Force Base, Colorado
 Winkler, David F. (1997), Searching the skies: the legacy of the United States Cold War defense radar program. Prepared for United States Air Force Headquarters Air Combat Command.

External links
 Fourth Air Force Factheet
 March Field Air Museum Official site
 The Museum is located off the grounds of the Base and displays in its aircraft collection examples bombers, fighters, cargo, refueling and reconnaissance aircraft, many of which served at March Field, March AFB and/or March ARB.

American Theater of World War II
Military units and formations in California
Military units and formations established in 1942
 Air Force 04
04
04